O. niger may refer to:
 Odonus niger, the redtoothed triggerfish or Niger trigger, a fish species of the tropical Indo-Pacific area
 Oxydoras niger, the ripsaw catfish, a fish species

See also
 Niger (disambiguation)